Jana Košecká is a Slovak computer scientist specializing in computer vision. She is a professor of computer science at George Mason University. Previously, Košecká was a researcher at Stanford University and the University of California, Berkeley.

Education and career
Košecká earned bachelor's and master's degrees in electrical engineering and computer science at the Slovak University of Technology in Bratislava; her master's thesis was on agricultural applications of artificial intelligence.
After seeing a conference talk on robotics by Ruzena Bajcsy, she became interested in the subject and moved to the General Robotics, Automation, Sensing & Perception Laboratory at the University of Pennsylvania, where she completed her Ph.D. with Bajcsy as her doctoral advisor in 1996.
Her dissertation was A Framework for Modeling and Verifying Visually Guided Agents: Design, Analysis and Experiments. She held visiting positions at Google, and Nokia Research.

Košecká spent three years doing postdoctoral research on the applications of computer vision to self-driving cars at the University of California, Berkeley, before taking her present position as a faculty member at George Mason University. During her time at Berkeley, Košecká was a visiting scholar at Stanford University.

Book
With Yi Ma, Stefano Soatto, and S. Shankar Sastry, Košecká is the author of the book An Invitation to 3-D Vision: From Images to Geometric Models (Springer, 2004).

Recognition
With Ma, Soatto, and Shastry, Košecká won the 1999 Marr Prize for their paper "Euclidean reconstruction and reprojection up to subgroups".
She was a keynote speaker at the 2018 International Conference on Robotics and Automation.

References

External links
Home page

Year of birth missing (living people)
Living people
American computer scientists
Slovak computer scientists
American women computer scientists
Computer vision researchers
University of Pennsylvania alumni
George Mason University faculty
Slovak University of Technology in Bratislava alumni
American women academics
21st-century American women